{{Infobox character
| name = Byomkesh Bakshi
| series = Byomkesh
| image = 
| caption = Poster of Byomkesh Bakshi TV series 
| first = Satyanweshi (1934)
| last = Bishupal Bodh.
| creator = Sharadindu Bandyopadhyay
| portrayer = 
| lbl21 = Height
| data21 = 
| lbl22 = Friend
| data22 = Ajit Kumar Bandopadhyay
| nickname = 
| occupation = Private investigator
| title = 
| spouse = Satyabati (wife)
| children = Khoka (son)
| relatives = 
| religion = Hindu Atheist
| nationality = Indian
| home = Harrison Road
| full_name = Byomkesh Bakshi (ব্যোমকেশ বক্সী)
}}
Byomkesh Bakshi is an Indian-Bengali fictional detective created by Sharadindu Bandyopadhyay. Referring to himself as a "truth-seeker" or Satyanweshi in the stories, Bakshi is known for his proficiency with observation, logical reasoning, and forensic science which he uses to solve complicated cases, usually murders, occurring in Calcutta. One of the most popular sleuths of Bengali literature, According to chronological order, Byomkesh Bakshi appeared for the first time in the story "Pather Kanta" — a story where Byomkesh shows that an assumption based on pure and simple logic is unbreakable and when we break down what is known in law as circumstantial evidence, there is nothing but logical assumptions. However his proper introduction is given in his third story, "Satyanweshi" — a story of murder dealing with illegal trafficking of opium. He appears in alias — under the pseudonym of Atul Chandra Mitra. It is here that Byomkesh meets Ajit Bandyopadhyay, a writer, who would become a constant companion of him and it is Ajit who narrates the Byomkesh stories.

Both of Byomkesh' names have since entered the Bengali language to describe someone who is both intelligent and observant. It is also used sarcastically to mean someone who states the obvious.

 Character 
Sharadindu Bandyopadhyay's most well known fictional character Byomkesh Bakshi first appeared as a character in the story Satyanweshi  (The Inquisitor). The story is set in 1932 in the Chinabazar area of Kolkata where a 'non-government detective' Byomkesh Bakshi, owing to the permission from the police commissioner, starts living in a mess in that area under the pseudonym of Atul Chandra Mitra to probe a series of murders.

Most of the stories are written from Ajit Kumar Banerjee's  perspective, who meets Byomkesh in the mess at Chinabazar. Byomkesh later asks Ajit to live with him at his three-story rented house at Harrison Road as his assistant and chronicler. The only other person in his household is his attendant Putiram.

In the beginning of the stories, Byomkesh Bakshi is described as "a man of twenty-three or twenty-four years of age who looked well educated." Byomkesh is a Hindu and wears mostly a white shirt/kurta with a white dhoti, occasionally draping a shawl. He does not live in luxury but possesses numerous books. He travels frequently, and does not own a gun and does not consider himself to be an "expensive helper". He habitually smokes and drinks tea with milk. He is fluent in Bengali, Hindi, and English.
Byomkesh does not like being called a detective, and thinks the word 'investigator' even worse. Thus he fashions a new name for himself which he inscribes on a brass plate in front of his house. The plaque read "Byomkesh Bakshi: Satyanweshi" (The Inquisitor).

 Family 
Unlike other lead characters in similar detective fictional stories, Byomkesh Bakshi marries, ages, and also contemplates material things such as buying a car. Later, he also decides to buy land in Keyatala in South Kolkata and shifts to his new home. Byomkesh meets Satyabati, his future wife and the accused Sukumar's sister, in 'Arthamanartham'. The story 'Adim Ripu' provides some information about Byomkesh's early childhood. His father Mahadev Bakshi was a mathematics teacher at a school and practised Sankhya philosophy at home while his mother was the daughter of a Vaishnavite. When Byomkesh was seventeen years old, his parents died of tuberculosis. Later, Byomkesh passed University with scholarship. During the Second World War and after India's independence, Byomkesh, Satyabati and Ajit live in the mess house of Harrison Road. Byomkesh gradually ages through the series, and has a son called Khoka (Little Boy) in the series.

 Byomkesh stories 

Saradindu Bandopadhyay penned 32 Byomkesh stories from 1932 to 1970 prior to his death. In his early stories, Ajit Kumar Banerjee is described as his companion, and chronicler of his stories. But in some cases Ajit also investigates in absence of Byomkesh (examples, Makorshar Rosh, Shoilo Rahasya). The stories are all written in traditional formal Bengali language. However, later the stories shift to more colloquial language. The later stories (Room Nombor Dui, Chhlonar Chhondo, Shajarur Kanta, Benisonghaar and Lohar Biskut) are not penned by Ajit, who was engaged in his publication business.

The stories are not very complicated but very engaging, with a long series of surprising events. The stories present a range of crimes from the first story, Satyanweshi, where Byomkesh destroys an international drug racket, to household mysteries and crimes like Arthamanartham and Makorshar Rosh.

Sharadindu did not want to continue the Byomkesh stories, due to which he stopped writing from 1938 to 1951. During that time he busied himself writing scripts for films in Bombay. After his return to West Bengal, Byomkesh stories were still in demand so he wrote Chitrachor (Picture Imperfect) in 1951 and other stories gradually on to 1970, when his last story "Bishupal Badh" (Killing of Bishupal) was left incomplete owing to his untimely death.

List of stories

 In television, movies and other media 

The Byomkesh Bakshi stories have been adapted into several television series, radio programs, audio dramas, films, and video games.Chiriyakhana (1967) is an Indian Bengali-language crime thriller film based on the story of the same name, directed by Satyajit Ray and written by Bandyopadhyay and Ray, it starred Uttam Kumar as Byomkesh Bakshi.

The 1993-97 Byomkesh Bakshi television series, created by Basu Chatterjee, and starring Rajit Kapur as Bakshi, and K.K. Raina as Ajit respectively, became one of the most critically acclaimed and celebrated adaptation of the character.

There have been 20 Bakshi movies, with Abir Chatterjee portraying the character seven times.

The Satyanweshi audio drama series created by actor Aneesh See Yay adapted twenty two Byomkesh Bakshi novels and seven original audio drama in the Malayalam language.

In 2015, A Bollywood movie named Detective Byomkesh Bakshy! starring Sushant Singh Rajput in lead role was also released.

He was also referenced in The Big Bang Theory Season 7 Episode 18: The Mommy Observation where Sherlock Holmes is referred to as "English Byomkesh Bakshi".

Radio Mirchi has adapted several stories and novels of Byomkesh including- Satyanweshi, Pather Kanta, Durgo Rahasya etc. for their audio story programme Sunday Suspense starring RJ Mir as Byomkesh and RJ Deep as Ajit.

See also
 Feluda
 Parashor Barma
 Kiriti Roy
 Roy, Pinaki. The Manichean Investigators: A Postcolonial and Cultural Rereading of the Sherlock Holmes and Byomkesh Bakshi Stories''. New Delhi: Sarup and Sons, 2008.

References 

 
Bakshi, Byomkesh
Bakshi, Byomkesh
Bakshi, Byomkesh
Bakshi, Byomkesh
Bakshi, Byomkesh
Indian detective novels
Indian crime novels